George Andrew Lake (12 May 1889 – 6 November 1918) was an English professional footballer who made one appearance in the Football League for Chelsea as a left half.

Personal life 
In 1915, during the second year of the First World War, Lake enlisted as a private in the 66th (2nd East Lancashire) Divisional Cyclist Company. He was later transferred to the Hampshire Regiment (later the Royal Hampshire Regiment) for service overseas, eventually joining the 2nd/4th Battalion of the regiment. Lake died of wounds on 6 November 1918, five days before the armistice with Germany, two days after his battalion's attempt to cross the Sambre–Oise Canal near Frasnoy, France. He was buried in Frasnoy Communal Cemetery. Lake was one of the two last English footballers to die in the war, dying on the same day as Edward Thompson. His great-nephew, Paul, would also become a footballer.

Career statistics

References

1889 births
1918 deaths
Military personnel from Merseyside
People from Eastham, Merseyside
English footballers
English Football League players
Association football wing halves
British Army personnel of World War I
Army Cyclist Corps soldiers
British military personnel killed in World War I
Royal Hampshire Regiment soldiers
Chelsea F.C. players
Manchester City F.C. players
Footballers from Merseyside